Stipagrostis namaquensis (river bushman grass; Afrikaans: Steekkweek, "stinging weed") is a species of grass native to South Africa and Namibia, especially in the Nama Karoo. It is listed as "safe" (LC) on the SANBI Red List.

Stipagrostis namaquensis is a perennial loose tussock with extended rhizomes. The lower sheathes are fuzzy, and the stems are kneaded or upright at 10–20 cm long. The leaf sheaths can be bare or fuzzy, but the leaves stick up 6–10 cm long and measure 1–2 mm wide. The flower is an open or lance-shaped plume if 10–15 cm, and the spines are 10–15 mm long.

African lovegrass is mildly suited to grazing.

References

Aristidoideae
Flora of Namibia
Flora of South Africa
Plants described in 1963